Marina is a station in the Barcelona Metro and Trambesòs tram networks, at the boundary between the Eixample and Sant Martí districts of Barcelona. It is served by TMB line L1 and tram route T4. The station is named after the nearby Carrer de la Marina, and can be accessed from Carrer dels Almogàvers, and the crossing of Carrer de la Marina with the Avinguda Meridiana. It is adapted for disabled people.

The metro station opened in 1933, as the terminus of an extension from Arc de Triomf station, and became a through station in 1951, when line L1 was extended to Clot station. When built, the station's platforms were located below the sidings of the former Estació del Nord railway station, and as a consequence they are now below the Parc de l'Estació del Nord that has replaced these sidings. Although the Estació del Nord itself has now been converted into a bus station and sports hall, these facilities are more easily accessed from Arc de Triomf metro station. The adjacent tram station opened in 2004.

See also
List of Barcelona Metro stations
List of tram stations in Barcelona

References

External links

Marina (L1) at Trenscat.com
Marina (T4) at Trenscat.com

Railway stations in Spain opened in 1933
El Poblenou
Transport in Sant Martí (district)
Trambesòs stops
Barcelona Metro line 1 stations